Eddie Monsoon may refer to:

Jennifer Saunders' character in Absolutely Fabulous
Ade Edmondson's character in The Comic Strip Presents...